Scandal in Budapest is a 1933 German-Hungarian comedy film, filmed in Hungary in the German language and directed by Géza von Bolváry and Istvan Szekely and starring Franciska Gaal, Werner Pledath, and Lotte Spira. It was made at Budapest's Hunnia Studios by the European subsidiary of Universal Pictures, headed by Joe Pasternak, which had recently left Germany in the face of Hitler's "de-Judification" of that country. A separate Hungarian-language version was also made, with a different cast, titled Pesti Szerelem (or Romance in Budapest). Both versions were released in the United States by Arthur Mayer's DuWorld Pictures Inc.

The film was subsequently remade in Hollywood as Top Hat, starring Fred Astaire and Ginger Rogers.

Cast

References

Bibliography
 Hales, Barbara &  Weinstein, Valerie. Rethinking Jewishness in Weimar Cinema. Berghahn Books, 2020.

External links

Films of the Weimar Republic
German comedy films
1933 comedy films
Films directed by Steve Sekely
Films directed by Géza von Bolváry
Films set in Budapest
Films produced by Joe Pasternak
German multilingual films
Universal Pictures films
Hungarian multilingual films
German black-and-white films
1933 multilingual films
1930s German films